James Jeremiah Shea (born April 13, 1966) is an associate justice of the Montana Supreme Court, appointed by Governor Steve Bullock. He previously served as a Judge on the Montana Workers' Compensation Court.

Education and legal career 
Shea graduated from the University of Montana School of Law in 1991 and started out as a law clerk for Chief Judge Paul G. Hatfield of the United States District Court for the District of Montana. Shea then worked as a trial attorney with the Metropolitan Public Defender in Portland, Oregon, before returning to Montana to practice mostly civil law.

State court service 
Shea was appointed by Gov. Brian Schweitzer to the Workers' Compensation Court in 2005  and was sworn into that position on September 7, 2005.  He was reappointed to a second term in 2011. Prior to his appointment to the bench, he was in private practice, most recently as a partner at the Missoula law firm of Paoli & Shea.

Appointment to Montana Supreme Court 
Governor Steve Bullock appointed Judge Shea to serve on the Montana Supreme Court. Shea replaced Judge Brian Morris, who was confirmed and commissioned as  a United States District Court Judge for the United States District Court for the District of Montana in December 2013. Shea's appointment was confirmed by the Montana State Senate by a vote of 41-9. He was sworn in on June 2, 2014. Shea ran unopposed in the 2016 election and was retained with 81.5 percent of the vote.

Personal life 
Shea was born and raised in Butte, Montana.  He graduated from Butte Central Catholic High School.  He and his wife Kathy met in college and married in 1989. They have two daughters, Kate and Moira.

References

External links
 Official Supreme Court bio
 
 Campaign Website: Shea for Justice

1966 births
Living people
Montana lawyers
Justices of the Montana Supreme Court
Politicians from Butte, Montana
University of Montana alumni
21st-century American judges